Landsting elections were held in Denmark on 14 April 1939, with the exception that the electors that elected the candidates standing in the constituencies were elected on 3 April.

As the election followed a dissolution of both chambers in order to call a referendum on changing the constitution, the seats of all seven constituencies as well as the seats elected by the parliament were up for election.

The referendum was held on 23 May but failed due to a low voter turnout.

Results

References

Elections in Denmark
Denmark
Landsting